Helioprosopa is a genus of tachinid flies in the family Tachinidae.

Species
Helioprosopa aurifodina Reinhard, 1964
Helioprosopa electilis Reinhard, 1964
Helioprosopa facialis Townsend, 1927
Helioprosopa finita Reinhard, 1964
Helioprosopa liciata Reinhard, 1964
Helioprosopa macrocera Reinhard, 1964
Helioprosopa velada Reinhard, 1964

External links

Tachinidae
Brachycera genera
Taxa named by Charles Henry Tyler Townsend